Mutatocoptops alboapicalis is a species of beetle in the family Cerambycidae. It was described by Maurice Pic in 1925. It is known from India, China, Laos, Thailand, and possibly Java and Malaysia.

References

Mesosini
Beetles described in 1925